Pomona station may refer to:

 Pomona railway station, a Citytrain station in Pomona, Queensland, Australia
 Pomona station (California), an Amtrak and Metrolink train station in Pomona, California, United States; also called Pomona–Downtown station
 Pomona tram stop, a tram stop on the Metrolink system in Manchester, England
 Pomona–North station, a Metrolink commuter rail station in Pomona, California, United States